The following radio stations broadcast on FM frequency 100.7 MHz:

Argentina
 Blue in Buenos Aires
 LRI310 Radiofónica in Rosario, Santa Fe
 La 100 Las Varillas in Las Varillas, Córdoba
 Pirámide in Río Cuarto, Córdoba
 Beat Radio in Cipolletti, Río Negro
 Radioactiva in El Territorio, Misiones
 Reporte in Paraná, Entre Ríos
 Sagitario in Las Lajitas, Salta
 Best in Corrientes
 Babel in Santa Rosa de Calamuchita, Córdoba
 Encuentro in Colonia Barón, La Pampa
 del Sol in Mar del Plata, Buenos Aires
 Centro in Ushuaia, Tierra del Fuego
 Ciudad de Merlo in Merlo, San Luis
 Láser in Guandacol, La Rioja
 Plenitud in Puerto Madryn, Chubut
 Fusión in San Vicente, Santa Fe
 Voces in La Plata, Buenos Aires

Australia
 2MC FM in Port Macquarie, New South Wales
 2WOW in Sydney, New South Wales
 3GLR in Latrobe Valley, Victoria
 FM 100.7 (Goulburn) in Goulburn, New South Wales
 Highlands FM in the Macedon Ranges, Victoria
 4RGD in Toowoomba, Queensland
 4RGR in Townsville, Queensland
 4US in Rockhampton, Queensland

Canada (Channel 264)
 CBFM-FM in Mistassini, Quebec
 CBFX-FM in Montreal, Quebec
 CBRE-FM in Exshaw, Alberta
 CFFA-FM in Laforge-2, Quebec
 CFNO-FM-1 in Nipigon, Ontario
 CFNO-FM-4 in Geraldton, Ontario
 CFNO-FM-8 in White River, Ontario
 CFRM-FM in Little Current, Ontario
 CHFA-4-FM in Hinton, Alberta
 CHIN-FM in Toronto, Ontario
 CHLM-FM-2 in La Sarre, Quebec
 CHRI-FM-2 in Pembroke, Ontario
 CIAJ-FM in Prince Rupert, British Columbia
 CIAY-FM in Whitehorse, Yukon
 CIGV-FM in Penticton, British Columbia
 CILG-FM in Moose Jaw, Saskatchewan
 CJHK-FM in Bridgewater, Nova Scotia
 CJLJ-FM in Williams Lake, British Columbia
 CJWA-FM-1 in Chapleau, Ontario
 CJWA-FM-3 in Wawa/Michipicoten, Ontario
 CKCC-FM in Campbell River, British Columbia
 CKNB-FM in Campbellton, New Brunswick
 CKOL-FM-1 in Madoc, Ontario
 CKRI-FM in Red Deer, Alberta
 CKUE-FM-1 in Windsor, Ontario

 VOCM-FM-1 in Clarenville, Newfoundland and Labrador

China 
 CNR Business Radio in Fushun

India
AIR FM Gold in New Delhi, Delhi

Indonesia
 Batam FM in Batam and Singapore

Mexico
 XHCER-FM in Cerralvo, Nuevo León
 XHFSM-FM in Puerto Vallarta, Jalisco
 XHGY-FM in Tehuacán, Puebla
 XHH-FM in Ciudad Juárez, Chihuahua
 XHHAC-FM in Ciudad Acuña, Coahuila
 XHJUA-FM in Guanajuato, Guanajuato
 XHPCAL-FM in Calkiní, Campeche
 XHPEM-FM in Tayoltita, Durango
 XHPMI-FM in Peñamiller, Querétaro
 XHSK-FM in Ruiz, Nayarit
 XHZPL-FM in La Paz, Baja California Sur

Philippines 
DWHY in Dagupan City
DWKM in Naga City
DWLW in Lucena City
DYOZ in Iloilo City
DYDR in Tacloban City
DXXX in Butuan City, Agusan del Norte
DXLX-FM in Cagayan De Oro City

Taiwan
 International Community Radio Taipei in Northern and Southern Taiwan

United Kingdom
  in Prestatyn
  in Teesside, Middlesbrough and parts of North Yorkshire
  in Birmingham and King's Norton (South)
  in Cambridge
  in Mountain Ash
  in North Middleton

United States (Channel 264)
  in Austin, Texas
  in George, California
 KBHQ-LP in Harrison, Arkansas
 KBNH-LP in Brownsville, Texas
 KBSF-LP in Portland, Oregon
 KCGG-LP in Kansas City, Kansas
 KCIW-LP in Brookings, Oregon
 KCLA-LP in San Pedro, California
 KEAZ in Kensett, Arkansas
 KEIT-LP in Colville, Washington
 KEVQ-FM in Crosbyton, Texas
  in San Diego, California
  in Troy, Missouri
  in Omaha, Nebraska
  in Pueblo, Colorado
  in Cape Girardeau, Missouri
  in Gillette, Wyoming
 KGXX in Susanville, California
  in Ventura, California
  in Hoisington, Kansas
 KHSS in Walla Walla, Washington
  in Bigfork, Montana
  in Bishop, California
  in Sauk Centre, Minnesota
 KJAD-LP in Topeka, Kansas
  in Duncan, Arizona
  in Eagle Grove, Iowa
  in Winnie, Texas
  in Iowa City, Iowa
 KKVT in Grand Junction, Colorado
 KKWF in Seattle, Washington
 KLBE-LP in Bismarck, North Dakota
 KLDQ in Harwood, North Dakota
 KLKF in Malin, Oregon
 KLVF in Las Vegas, New Mexico
 KLYF-LP in Coquille, Oregon
  in Bend, Oregon
 KMKV in Kihei, Hawaii
  in Lowry, South Dakota
  in Carrollton, Missouri
 KNDL in Berthold, North Dakota
 KNSH in Fort Smith, Arkansas
 KOLF-LP in Plainview, Texas
 KOLT-FM in Cheyenne, Wyoming
 KPDA in Mountain Home, Idaho
 KPDW-LP in Pharr, Texas
 KPFS-LP in Elk City, Oklahoma
 KPLU (FM) in Palacios, Texas
  in Ponca City, Oklahoma
  in Depoe Bay, Oregon
  in Salinas, California
 KPYU-LP in Old Pascua Village, Arizona
 KQRZ-LP in Hillsboro, Oregon
  in Sutherland, Nebraska
 KRWS-LP in Hardin, Montana
 KSHQ in Deerfield, Missouri
  in Scottsdale, Arizona
 KSRK-LP in Pine Bluff, Arkansas
  in Corning, California
 KTYK in Overton, Texas
 KULL in Abilene, Texas
  in San Rafael, California
 KWMJ in Cotulla, Texas
  in Highland Village, Texas
 KXLB in Churchill, Montana
  in Juneau, Alaska
 KXTR-LP in Stephenville, Texas
  in Milan, New Mexico
 KXZY-LP in Waco, Texas
 KYMV in Woodruff, Utah
  in Natchitoches, Louisiana
 WAOG-LP in Aberdeen, North Carolina
  in Bulls Gap, Tennessee
  in Eau Claire, Wisconsin
  in Elkhart, Indiana
 WBZZ in New Kensington, Pennsylvania
  in Ashland, Alabama
 WCKP-LP in Ocala, Florida
  in Galeton, Pennsylvania
  in Irvine, Kentucky
  in Greenville, Mississippi
 WDRX-LP in Cortland, New York
  in Buena Vista, Georgia
  in Springfield, Ohio
 WEFX in Henderson, New York
 WEHR-LP in Port Saint Lucie, Florida
 WEJK-LP in Connersville, Indiana
 WFCB-LP in Ferndale, Michigan
  in Midway, Florida
  in Peekskill, New York
  in Fort Lauderdale, Florida
 WIGY-FM in Mexico, Maine
  in Lansing, Michigan
 WJSL-LP in Southport, North Carolina
 WJTQ in Pensacola, Florida
  in Racine, Wisconsin
  in Brownsville, Kentucky
  in Utica, New York
 WKWQ-LP in Beaufort, South Carolina
 WLEV in Allentown, Pennsylvania
 WLJF-LP in Greensboro, North Carolina
  in Milledgeville, Georgia
  in Terre Haute, Indiana
  in Grundy, Virginia
 WMMS in Cleveland, Ohio
  in Tampa, Florida
 WMUV in Brunswick, Georgia
  in Crystal Falls, Michigan
 WPJP-LP in Madisonville, Kentucky
 WPPP-LP in Athens, Georgia
  in Harrisonburg, Virginia
 WRDU in Rocky Mount, North Carolina
 WRES-LP in Asheville, North Carolina
  in Coal City, Illinois
 WSLP in Ray Brook, New York
 WTGE in Baton Rouge, Louisiana
 WTHK in Wilmington, Vermont
 WTIJ-LP in Bryson City, North Carolina 
 WTNP-LP in Waterville, Maine
 WUBZ-LP in Tuskegee, Alabama
 WUOH-LP in Orlando, Florida
  in Cleveland, Tennessee
 WUTQ-FM in Utica, New York
 WVBD in Fayetteville, West Virginia
 WVHK in Christiansburg, Virginia
 WWHX in Normal, Illinois
 WWON-FM in Waynesboro, Tennessee
  in Oscoda, Michigan
  in Bayamon, Puerto Rico
 WYDL in Middleton, Tennessee
  in Andrews, South Carolina
  in Westminster, Maryland
  in Banner Elk, North Carolina
 WZLX in Boston, Massachusetts
 WZQR-LP in Bokeelia, Florida
  in Wildwood, New Jersey

References

Lists of radio stations by frequency